Propebela luetkeana is a species of sea snail, a marine gastropod mollusk in the family Mangeliidae.

Description

Distribution
This marine species occurs in the Bering Sea

References

 Krause, A. (1885). Ein Beitrag zur kenntnis der Molluskenfauna des Beringsmeres. II. Gastropods und Pteropoda. Archiv für Naturgeschichte. 51(1): 256–302, pls 16–18.
 Merkuljev A.V. (2015). The Bering Sea prosobranchiate gastropod species described by A. Krause in 1885 [in Russian]. Ruthenica. 25(4): 133-137

External links
 

luetkeana
Gastropods described in 1885